List of television series about vampires, creatures from folklore that subsist by feeding on the vital essence (generally in the form of blood) of the living. In European folklore, vampires are undead creatures that often visited loved ones and caused mischief or deaths in the neighbourhoods they inhabited while they were alive.

Vampire television series

Live action

Animated

Vampire web series

See also 
Vampire films
List of vampire films
Vampire literature
List of fictional vampires

References

External links
 Ranked: Vampire TV Shows at Metacritic

Vampire
Vampire
Vampire